The 1915 Saskatchewan Huskies football team represented the University of Saskatchewan in Canadian football. This was their third season.

Schedule

Roster

References

Saskatchewan Huskies football seasons
1915 in Canadian football